KVCC may refer to:

 KVCC (FM), a radio station (88.5 FM) licensed to serve Tucson, Arizona, United States
 Kalamazoo Valley Community College, a community college in Michigan
 Kennebec Valley Community College, a community college in Maine
 Knollwood Village Civic Club, which manages Knollwood Village, Houston